Berat Buzhala Born on March 15, 1975, in Klinë Kosovo is a former Kosovo Member of Parliament for the former governing Democratic Party of Kosovo. He joined the political party after working as a journalist. He left politics and returned to journalism after serving a single mandate in the Parliament. Buzhala belongs to a young generation of Kosovar journalists, established after the Kosovo War. He initially worked as an economics journalist in daily Zeri and Koha Ditore, and was later one of the co-founders of daily Express. In 2018, Buzhala helped establish a new TV channel in Kosovo named T7 which engages in independent journalism and in-depth political and economic coverage. 

Berat Buzhala was born in Çabiq, municipality of Klinë. He works and lives in Pristina.

External links
 Webpage of daily Express
 An article in WaPost

References

Kosovo Albanians
Kosovan journalists
Living people
1975 births